The La Chaise-Dieu Music Festival is a classical music festival that takes place every year at the end of August. It is essentially devoted to sacred music and takes place mainly in the La Chaise-Dieu Abbey. In 2016, the Festival celebrated its 50th anniversary.

History 
Georges Cziffra (1921–1994), the famous Hungarian pianist, is at the initiative of a festival in La Chaise-Dieu, after having discovered the abbey church and its organ, during a private stay at the home of Dr. Georges Mazoyer and his wife Suzanne. Accompanied by his son, György Cziffra (1942–1981), a conductor, he gave several recitals and concerts from 1966 onwards.

It was Suzanne Mazoyer who, while travelling by car, saw La Chaise-Dieu Abbey and told her husband: this is where the festival should be held. The mechanism of the abbey church organ was then in ruins and Master Cziffra agreed, on the proposal of the Mazoyer couple, to give some concerts and to donate the fees received to the reconstruction of the site. The master will perform there for a long time to come.

The arrival in 1976 of Guy Ramona, and the creation by several music lovers of an association to continue the Festival, gave a new impetus to the event. The number of concerts is steadily increasing and stabilizes at around 35 in the Saint-Robert Abbey in La Chaise-Dieu, but also in other heritage sites in the region: the churches of Puy-en-Velay and its Italian theater, the Église Saint-Jean d'Ambert, the Basilique Saint-Julien of Brioude, the Saint-Georges Church of Saint-Paulien, the Saint-Gilles Church of Chamalières-sur-Loire. 

Guy Ramona directed the festival for 27 years and gave it its final character, not hesitating to present, among the first in the rehabilitation of the baroque repertoire, contemporary works conducted or in the presence of their composers. 

In 2003, Jean-Michel Mathé took over from Guy Ramona, who nevertheless remained present in the organisation of the festival by becoming president of the management association until 2009 when Jacques Barrot succeeded him. He is currently, with his wife, the honorary president. 

Since 2010, the Festival has also been taking over the Cziffra Auditorium in La Chaise-Dieu, a building inaugurated during the 44th edition. The first step in the major renovation project of the abbey's monastery buildings, the Cziffra auditorium is ideal for recitals and chamber music, and offers a different and more intimate programme (200 seats) for festival-goers.

Features 
The festival, which takes place every summer at the end of August, is now mainly centred on sacred music but also offers a romantic and symphonic repertoire, but also contemporary music, pursuing, under the impetus of Jean-Michel Mathé, the general policy of his predecessor. Famous musicians such as Georges Cziffra, Yehudi Menuhin, Mstislav Rostropovitch, Ivry Gitlis, Augustin Dumay, Jean-Philippe Collard, Katia and Marielle Labèque, Jean-Claude Malgoire, Michel Corboz, William Christie, Maurice André, Laurent Campellone, Marie-Claire Alain, Krzysztof Penderecki, etc. have performed there.

References

External links 
 Official website of the festival

La Chaise-Dieu